Ambrosius Benson (in Ferrara or Milan1550, in Flanders) was an Italian painter who became a part of the Northern Renaissance.

While many surviving paintings have been attributed, there is very little known of him from records, and he tended not to sign his work. He is believed to be responsible for mainly religious art, but also painted portraits on commission. He sometime painted from classical sources, often setting the figures in modern-dress, or a contemporary domestic setting. In his lifetime he was successful; he had a large workshop, his work was sold internationally and he was especially popular in Spain.

Benson became popular as a source for pastiche with 19th-century painters, who are sometimes known as the "followers of Benson". In particular his many variations of the Magdalen and Sibilla Persica were further copied and became popular with contemporary buyers.

Life

Although Ambrosius Benson (or Ambrose Benzone, as he is named by an early scholar in deference to his Lombardian origin) was Italian by birth, scholars consider him a painter of the Flemish school. Typical of the itinerant manner of many painters of the time, he moved to Bruges  and served his apprenticeship with the Early Netherlandish painter Gerard David. He later became a naturalized citizen of Bruges. Benson worked as a journeyman before he was made master in 1519 and became a member of the guild of painters and saddle makers. He eventually became a dean and then a governor of the guild. He married Anna Ghyselin, and had two sons with her, Jan and Willem, both of whom became painters. He later remarried and had a daughter Anna. He is believed to have had at least two other daughters from extramarital affairs.

Benson came into dispute with Gerard around 1519, over a number of paintings and drawings Benson had created—including a book of studies for heads and nudes as well as various patterns—in the older master's workshop without his assistance. David refused to return the material, and after Benson pursued him legally, served time in prison for his appropriation.

He served as head of the Guild of Saint Luke from 1537 to 1539 and 1543 to 1544. Much of his work was at one time attributed to a Spanish artist known only as the Master of Segovia; it is now believed they were the same person. This is surely the reason why many of his best works can be found in Spanish museums, churches and cathedrals (Prado Museum, Bilbao Fine Arts Museum, Segovia and Burgos Cathedrals, among others).

Perhaps under the influence of Rogier van der Weyden's 15th-century The Magdalen Reading, Benson was one of the first artists to popularise images of women reading. It became a motif for him, and he painted the scene many times in his images of Mary Magdalen and the Sybil Persica, whom he treated as almost interchangeable. One The Magdalen Reading by Benson is held in the National Gallery, London.

Gallery

Notes

References

Sources

 Friedländer, Max J. "Ambrosius Benson as a Portrait Painter". "Yearbook of the Prussian art collections", 1910. 31

External links
Gerard David: purity of vision in an age of transition, an exhibition catalog from The Metropolitan Museum of Art (fully available online as PDF), which contains material on Benson (see index)
 Sacha Zdanov, "Benson, Ambrosius", Nouvelle Biographie nationale 13, Brussels: Académie royale de Belgique, 2016, p. 19-21 .

15th-century births
1550 deaths
16th-century Italian painters
Italian male painters
Early Netherlandish painters
Flemish Mannerist painters
Year of birth uncertain
Artists from Milan
Painters from Ferrara
Artists from Bruges